Lyria solangeae is a species of sea snail, a marine gastropod mollusk in the family Volutidae, the volutes.

Description
The length of the shell attains 53.85 mm

Distribution
This marine species occurs off Madagascar.

References

 Bozzetti L. (2008). Lyria solangeae (Gastropoda: Volutidae) nuova specie dal Madagascar sud-orientale. Malacologia Mostra Mondiale 61: 5-7

External links

Volutidae
Gastropods described in 2008